Arlyne Brickman (1934–2020) was a mafia informant.

Biography
Brickman was born in New York's Lower East Side in 1934. When growing up in New York City's Lower East Side, Brickman chose as her role model Virginia Hill, girlfriend of gangster Bugsy Siegel. Brickman said of Hill, "here was a broad that really made it good." As a teenager Brickman became involved with Italian mobsters, hanging out in mafia nightclubs, seducing them in Cadillacs, and in later years running drugs. At 35, Brickman was beaten and raped by gangsters and learned none of her mafia friends would help since she was a woman and Jewish.

According to Brickman, she turned on the mob eight years later when a loan shark threatened to hurt her eighteen-year-old, only daughter Leslie, unless Brickman paid off a loan. Brickman contacted the FBI, agreeing to wear a wire, hiding the microphone in her brassiere or purse. In return, the government paid her debts and gave her a plea bargain. Over the next decade, Brickman worked as an informant and in 1986 her testimony helped convict gangster Anthony Scarpati of the Colombo crime family and several others of racketeering conspiracy.

After the Scarpati trial, Brickman refused to participate in the Witness Protection Program because, in her words, "That's the quickest way to get killed." Brickman resided in Bal Harbor Florida. She died in an assisted living home, alone, suffering from dementia in January 2020.

Brickman was the subject of the non-fiction book Mob Girl: A Woman's Life in the Underworld by Teresa Carpenter, published by Simon & Schuster. 

Much of her families connections were "fabricated and taken out of context", according to Brickman. Her father "was never a racketeer". "He was a true gentleman, highly respected by all that knew him". She and Carpenter had a tumultuous relationship. They never spoke again after the book was published.

Her life was also detailed in an episode of Mobsters, an AE series, in Season 1 Episode 27 "Mobsters: Mob Ladies".

References

External links
 

American drug traffickers
American Mafia
Jewish American gangsters
People from the Lower East Side
1934 births
2020 deaths